Ümit V. Çatalyürek is a professor of computer science at the Georgia Institute of Technology, and Adjunct Professor in department of Biomedical Informatics at the Ohio State University. He is known for his work on graph analytics, parallel algorithms for scientific applications, data-intensive computing, and large scale genomic and biomedical applications. He was the director of the High Performance Computing Lab at the Ohio State University. He was named Fellow of the Institute of Electrical and Electronics Engineers (IEEE) in 2016 for contributions to combinatorial scientific computing and parallel computing.

Education
Çatalyürek completed his B.S. in Computer Engineering and Information Science at the Bilkent University in the year 1992 and received his Ph.D. in Computer Engineering and Information Science from the  Bilkent University in 2000, under the supervision of Cevdet Aykanat. His dissertation was published by the Bilkent University as Hypergraph Models for Sparse Matrix Partitioning and Reordering.

Career
Çatalyürek began his career in 1992 as a research associate for Department of Computer Engineering and Information Science, Bilkent University, Turkey. He then joined as visiting research scientist at UMIACS, Research institute in College Park at the University of Maryland and research associate at Johns Hopkins Medical Institutions in 1999. Catalyurek later moved to Columbus to join The Ohio State University in 2001, as assistant professor, where he remained at this position until 2007 before promoted as Associate Professor in the department of Biomedical Informatics. He served different positions at The Ohio State University before joining as a professor at Georgia Institute of Technology in 2016, where he later became Associate Chair for Academic Programs at the Georgia Institute of Technology.

Çatalyürek is Editor-in-Chief of Elsevier's Parallel Computing journal. He also served as an editorial board member for IEEE Transactions on Parallel and Distributed Computing, the Journal of Parallel and Distributed Computing, and the SIAM Journal of Scientific Computing.

Awards and honors
 Çatalyürek is an NSF CAREER Award recipient in 2007.
 In 2015, he was named as IEEE Fellow. He also received OSU Lumley Interdisciplinary Research Award. 
 He was elected as Chair for IEEE CS's Technical Committee on Parallel Processing in 2016-2017. He was also elected as Vice Chair for ACM ACM Special Interest Group on Bioinformatics, Computational Biology, and Biomedical Informatics in 2015-2017.

Selected publications
Çatalyürek has co-authored over 200 articles in peer-reviewed journals and conferences.

References 

Fellow Members of the IEEE
Living people
Year of birth missing (living people)